The Rally of the Ecologists of Burkina (RDEB) (Rassemblement des Écologistes du Burkina) is a political party in Burkina Faso.

Background
RDEB candidate Ram Ouédraogo ran in the 13 November 2005 presidential election, placing 5th out of 13 candidates with 2.04% of the vote.

See also

Conservation movement
Environmental movement
Green party
Green politics
List of environmental organizations
Sustainability
Sustainable development

Political parties in Burkina Faso
Green parties in Africa